Romeo & Juliet is the first studio album by the disco musician Alec R. Costandinos and the Syncophonic Orchestra released in 1978. It was recorded at Trident Studios, London, in September 1977 and released by Ibis in France and Casablanca Records in the US.

The album consists of one over 30-minutes long disco suite composed of five acts, including various instruments and genres. It included famous collaborators such as Don Ray, Herbie Flowers, Peter Van Hooke, Alan Hawkshaw, Chris Karan, Frank Ricotti and the photographer Ron Slenzak. One fragment was released as a "Romeo and Juliet" single and reached the top of US Hot Dance Club Play chart in March 1978. The album was called "conceptual masterpiece" by the AllMusic reviewer Jason Birchmeier, who gave it 4.5 out of 5 stars.

Track listing

Personnel 
Adapted from:
Arrangement – Don Ray
Art direction, design – Gribbitt!, Henry Vizcarra, Phyllis Chotin
Bass – Herbie Flowers
Brass – John Watson's Brass Section
Drums – Peter Van Hooke
Engineering – Peter R. Kelsey
Guitar – Chris Rae, Rick Hitchcock, Slim Pezin
Keyboards – Alan Hawkshaw, Alec R. Costandinos, Raymond Donnez
Percussion – Chris Karan, Frank Ricotti, John Dean
Performer – The Birds Of Paris
Photography – Ron Slenzak
Producing, composing – Alec R. Costandinos
Programming of synthesizers – George Rodi
Strings – The Pat Halling String Ensemble
Tape Operator – Collin Green, Peter Kamlish, Reno Ruocco
Technician – Stephen Short

References

External links 
 

1977 debut albums
Alec R. Costandinos albums